El Portal may refer to:
 El Portal, California
 El Portal, Florida
 KXXZ, branded as El Portal, a radio station in Barstow, California